Rajdeep Gupta is a Bengali film and television actor and was born in Kolkata.

Career
Rajdeep has made a name for himself in the industry with his spontaneous acting skills and guy next door roles.

After a brief stint as a DJ at popular clubs in Delhi, Kolkata and Dhaka. His career kick started on the small screen when he bagged the role of Ishaan, in the soap Ogo Bodhu Sundari in 2009. The soap aired on Star Jalsha under Ravi Ojha productions. He made a comeback on television with an episodic appearance in the detective drama series, titled Byomkesh, following which he played the lead role in the Surinder Films produced show, Aponjon. Rajdeep also played the lead in Jhanjh Lobongo Phool, which aired on Star Jalsha Produced by SVF. And he even tried his hand in some negative roles in television shows like Premer kahini Star jalsha and Baksho Bodol zee bangla

Apart from television, he has acted in films.  His first film was damadol and has also acted in films such as Bhaarate, Aamar Aami, Mukti, and Onnyo bwasanto. He starred in one of the episodes of Pyaar Ka The End – his first Hindi language television performance. He has worked in hoichoi Originals such as Japani Toy, Mismatch, Mismatch 2 and Japani Doll, bou kyano psycho, rohoshya romancho 2
Murder in the hills Uttoron
Trying his hands on advertisement, Rajdeep has also worked for national ad campaigns of renowned brands. And has been the face of Uber India campaign 2016.

Film
 Damadol 2011
 Mukti 2012
 The play, 2013
 Bharaate 2014
 Onnya boshonto 2015
 Teen Cup Chaa Hoichoi original short (2018)
 Baagh Bandhi Khela (2018)
 Mon Jaane Na (2019)

TV serials
Ogo Bodhu Sundori (later replaced by Rehaan Roy)
Byomkesh
'Alpo alpo premer golpoAponjon Jhanj Lobongo Phool Premer Kahini Baksho Bodol Panchomi''

Web series

References

External links

Indian male film actors
Living people
Male actors from Kolkata
Male actors in Bengali cinema
21st-century Indian male actors
Year of birth missing (living people)